Patrick Beverley (born July 12, 1988) is an American professional basketball player for the Chicago Bulls of the National Basketball Association (NBA). He played college basketball for the Arkansas Razorbacks before spending three and a half seasons overseas in Ukraine, Greece, and Russia. In January 2013, he joined the Houston Rockets. In June 2017, he was traded to the Los Angeles Clippers  

The Clippers traded him to the Memphis Grizzlies in 2021, and then he was traded to the Minnesota Timberwolves nine days later. In July 2022, The Timberwolves traded him to the Utah Jazz, and then he was traded to the Los Angeles Lakers in August 2022. In February 2023, Beverley was traded to the Orlando Magic. Shortly after, he was waived and the Orlando Magic agreed to buyout his contract for the remainder of the season.

Beverley is a three-time NBA All-Defensive Team member, known for his physicality. His intense style of play has led to Beverley being involved in several publicized on-court incidents.

High school career
Beverley was born on July 12, 1988. He attended Waubonsie Valley High School in a suburb of Chicago, Illinois, as a freshman before transferring to John Marshall Metropolitan High School on Chicago's West Side. As a senior at John Marshall, he led the state in scoring with 37.3 points per game and was named Co-Player of the Year. Beverley was also selected to play in the Roundball Classic on April 8, 2006, a national high school All-Star Game held at Chicago's United Center.

College career
As a freshman playing for the Arkansas Razorbacks in 2006–07, Beverley recorded averages of 13.9 points, 4.5 rebounds, 3.1 assists, and 1.7 steals per contest. He was named the Southeastern Conference Newcomer of the Year by the Associated Press and the SEC Freshman of the Year by the league's coaches. He earned SEC All-Freshman Team honors and second-team All-SEC honors.

As a sophomore in 2007–08, Beverley started in 33 of 35 contests and led the Razorbacks in rebounds (6.6 rpg), steals (1.3 spg), and 3-point percentage (.378), and was second in points (12.1 ppg) and third in assists (2.4 apg). For his performance in the 2007–08 campaign, Beverley was a candidate for the Wooden Award as well as Naismith Trophy.

In August 2008, Beverley was deemed ineligible to play in the 2008–09 season due to academic issues. Dispelling speculation that insufficient grades were to blame, Beverley admitted that he had been suspended because of an academic integrity issue on a class paper. Instead of waiting out his suspension, Beverley hired an agent and decided to hone his skills for the NBA in Europe. Although originally denying it he eventually owned up to it saying "Someone did a paper for me. I turned in a paper that wasn't mine. I accepted full punishment for it. That's over. I served my punishment"

Professional career

BC Dnipro (2008–2009)
In October 2008, at the age of 20, Beverley had a child and signed a one-year contract for "just over six figures" with the Ukrainian team Dnipro; the contract had no buyout, and Beverley was free to leave at season's end without penalty. He participated in the Ukrainian Basketball League (UBL) All-Star Game and won the league's Slam Dunk Contest. In 46 games for Dnipro, Beverley averaged 16.7 points, 7 rebounds, 3.6 assists, 2.2 steals and 1.3 blocks.

Olympiacos Piraeus (2009–2010)
Beverley was automatically entered into the 2009 NBA draft, where he was selected with the 42nd overall pick by the Los Angeles Lakers. On June 26, 2009, a day after the draft, the Miami Heat announced that they had acquired the draft rights to Beverley from the Lakers in exchange for a 2011 second-round draft pick and cash considerations. He was later cut as a part of the final roster cuts.

On August 26, 2009, Beverley signed with the Greek team Olympiacos Piraeus. He helped Olympiacos win the 2010 Greek Cup title and reach the finals of both the EuroLeague and the Greek League. In 19 EuroLeague games, he averaged 2.7 points and 1.9 rebounds. He also appeared in 22 Greek League games and averaged 4.9 points, 2.8 rebounds, and 1.6 assists.

Spartak St. Petersburg (2011–2012)

On January 9, 2011, Beverley signed with Spartak St. Petersburg for the rest of the 2010–11 season. On November 10, 2011, he signed a contract extension with Spartak. The new deal locked Beverley in with the team through 2014 and included an option for the 2014–15 season. On January 28, 2012, Beverley scored a professional career-high 38 points to go along with 7 rebounds and 5 assists in a 2OT loss to the Spartak Primorye.

On April 6, 2012, Beverley was selected as the EuroCup MVP for the 2011–12 season. He dominated throughout the season as he led his team to a spot in the EuroCup semifinals. He was a team leader in scoring, steals, and performance index rating, and placed second in rebounds, assists and three-pointers made; the team led the competition in defense and lost only 3 games, with a 13–3 record. His 1.9 steals per game led the EuroCup, he was second in index rating, and at just 1.85 meters, Beverley was the shortest player in the competition to average more than 4 rebounds per game.

On July 19, 2012, Beverley announced that he would not be returning to Spartak for the 2012–13 season, but Spartak insisted that he honor his contract—he could only void his contract if he received an NBA offer. He continued on with Spartak in 2012–13, but left the team on December 23 after reaching an agreement with the Houston Rockets.

Houston Rockets (2013–2017)
On January 7, 2013, Beverley signed a multi-year deal with the Rockets and was immediately assigned to the Rio Grande Valley Vipers of the NBA Development League. He spent a week with the Vipers before making his NBA debut on January 15, 2013, in a 117–109 loss to the Los Angeles Clippers. In just under two minutes off the bench, he recorded three points, one assist and one steal. On February 23, 2013, he made three 3-pointers and scored a career-high 15 points in a 105–103 loss to the Washington Wizards. In his first season with Houston, he averaged 5.6 points, 2.7 rebounds, 2.9 assists and 0.90 steals in 41 games. In Game 2 of the Rockets' first-round playoff series against the Oklahoma City Thunder, Beverley had his first career start and recorded 16 points, 12 rebounds, six assists, two steals and one block. He had another 16-point effort in Game 4 to help the Rockets avoid elimination with a 105–103 win, but they lost the series in six games.
Beverley had an injury-plagued season in 2013–14; he played 56 out of 82 games. He was placed on the inactive list for 14 games following surgery on December 23 to repair a fracture in his right hand. On February 23, he had his first career 20-point outing in a 115–112 win over the Phoenix Suns. He tied that mark in the third-last game of the season, scoring 20 points in a 111–104 win over the New Orleans Pelicans on April 12. On June 2, 2014, he was named in the NBA All-Defensive Second Team for the 2013–14 season.

On February 14, 2015, Beverley came from behind in the semifinal and final rounds to win the Skills Challenge during NBA All-Star Weekend. On March 30, 2015, he was ruled out for the rest of the season with a left wrist injury.

On July 9, 2015, Beverley re-signed with the Rockets on a four-year, $23 million deal. He was selected to compete in the 2016 Skills Challenge to defend his title, but an ankle injury forced him to withdraw. On March 18, 2016, he recorded a then season-high 18 points and a career-high 10 assists in a 116–111 win over the Minnesota Timberwolves. On March 31, he scored a career-high 22 points in a 103–100 loss to the Chicago Bulls.

On October 22, 2016, Beverley was ruled out for three weeks after requiring arthroscopic surgery on his left knee. He made his season debut on November 17, 2016 after missing the first 11 games. Limited to 25 minutes, Beverley had 11 points, three assists and three blocks in a 126–109 win over the Portland Trail Blazers. On December 7, 2016, he came three rebounds shy of his first career triple-double, finishing with 10 points, seven rebounds and tying a career high with 12 assists in a 134–95 win over the Los Angeles Lakers. He came close again on December 21, recording a season-high 18 points, nine assists and nine rebounds in a 125–111 win over the Phoenix Suns. On April 2, 2017, he scored a career-high 26 points in a 123–116 win over the Phoenix Suns. On April 16, 2017, he had a playoff career-best 21 points along with 10 rebounds in a 118–87 win over the Oklahoma City Thunder in Game 1 of their first-round playoff series. At the season's end, Beverley was named to the NBA All-Defensive First Team, becoming the fourth player in franchise history to earn All-Defensive First Team honors and the first since Scottie Pippen in 1998–99. He also won the NBA Hustle Award.

Los Angeles Clippers (2017–2021)
On June 28, 2017, the Los Angeles Clippers acquired Beverley, Sam Dekker, Montrezl Harrell, Darrun Hilliard, DeAndre Liggins, Lou Williams, Kyle Wiltjer and a 2018 first-round pick from the Houston Rockets in exchange for Chris Paul. In his debut for the Clippers in their season opener on October 19, 2017, Beverley scored 10 points in a 108–92 win over the Los Angeles Lakers. After dealing with right knee soreness throughout the preseason, Beverley missed five games in mid-November with a similar sore right knee. On November 22, 2017, he was ruled out for the rest of the season after undergoing an arthroscopic lateral meniscus repair, and a microfracture procedure, on his right knee.

On January 27, 2019, Beverley had 16 points, 10 rebounds and eight assists in a 122–108 win over the Sacramento Kings. In the first round of the playoffs against the Golden State Warriors, Beverley had two 14-rebound efforts.

On July 12, 2019, Beverley re-signed with the Clippers to a three-year deal.

On July 3, 2021, Beverley was suspended for one game for pushing Chris Paul during Game 6 of the Western Conference Finals of the playoffs against the Phoenix Suns. The Clippers lost the game, ending their season. Beverley's suspension made him the first player to be suspended for the first game of the following season since Andrew Bynum in the 2011 NBA playoffs for shoving and elbowing J. J. Barea during the Los Angeles Lakers' four-game sweep by the eventual NBA champions, the Dallas Mavericks.

Minnesota Timberwolves (2021–2022)
On August 16, 2021, Beverley was traded, alongside Daniel Oturu and Rajon Rondo, to the Memphis Grizzlies in exchange for Eric Bledsoe. On August 25, the Grizzlies traded Beverley to the Minnesota Timberwolves in exchange for Jarrett Culver and Juancho Hernangómez. On October 23, Beverley made his Timberwolves debut, recording five points, three rebounds and six assists in a 96–89 win over the New Orleans Pelicans. On January 3, 2022, he recorded a career-high tying 12 assists, alongside eleven points, three rebounds and two steals, in a 122–104 win over the Los Angeles Clippers. Two days later, he scored a season-high 20 points, alongside four rebounds and six assists, in a 98–90 win over the Oklahoma City Thunder. On February 16, Beverley signed a one-year, $13 million contract extension with the Timberwolves. On March 14, he scored 20 points, alongside four rebounds and eight assists, in a 149–139 win over the San Antonio Spurs.

After a play-in tournament win over the Los Angeles Clippers Beverley was notably recognized for his emphatic celebration. Beverley recorded seven points, eleven rebounds and three assists, the Timberwolves qualified for the playoffs for the first time since 2018 and faced the Memphis Grizzlies during their first-round series. On April 23, Beverley recorded 17 points, five rebounds and two blocks in a 119–118 Game 4 win. The Timberwolves ended up losing the series in six games, with Beverley averaging 11 points and 4.8 assists per game.

Los Angeles Lakers (2022–2023) 
On July 6, 2022, Beverley was traded, alongside with Malik Beasley, Jarred Vanderbilt, Leandro Bolmaro, the draft rights to Walker Kessler, four future first round picks and a pick swap, to the Utah Jazz in exchange for Rudy Gobert. On August 25, 2022, Beverley was traded to the Los Angeles Lakers in exchange for Stanley Johnson and Talen Horton-Tucker. On October 18, Beverley made his Lakers debut, putting up three points in a 123–109 loss to the Golden State Warriors. On November 24, Beverley was suspended for three games after shoving Deandre Ayton of the Phoenix Suns from behind during an on-court altercation.

On February 9, 2023, Beverley was traded to the Orlando Magic in a four-team trade involving the Los Angeles Clippers and Denver Nuggets. He and the Magic agreed to a contract buyout three days later, and he was subsequently waived.

Chicago Bulls (2023–present) 
On February 21, 2023, Beverley signed with his hometown team, the Chicago Bulls, deciding between them and the defending champion Golden State Warriors. In his Bulls debut, he contributed eight points, five rebounds and four assists in a 131-87 victory over the Brooklyn Nets.

Career statistics

NBA

Regular season

|-
| style="text-align:left;"|
| style="text-align:left;"|Houston
| 41 || 0 || 17.4 || .418 || .375 || .829 || 2.7 || 2.9 || .9 || .5 || 5.6
|-
| style="text-align:left;"|
| style="text-align:left;"|Houston
| 56 || 55 || 31.3 || .414 || .361 || .814 || 3.5 || 2.7 || 1.4 || .4 || 10.2
|-
| style="text-align:left;"|
| style="text-align:left;"|Houston
| 56 || 55 || 30.8 || .383 || .356 || .750 || 4.2 || 3.4 || 1.1 || .4 || 10.1
|-
| style="text-align:left;"|
| style="text-align:left;"|Houston
| 71 || 63 || 28.7 || .434 || .400  || .682 || 3.5 || 3.4 || 1.3 || .4 || 9.9
|-
| style="text-align:left;"|
| style="text-align:left;"|Houston
| 67 || 67 || 30.7 || .420 || .383  || .768 || 5.9 || 4.2 || 1.5 || .4 || 9.5
|-
| style="text-align:left;"|
| style="text-align:left;"|L.A. Clippers
| 11 || 11 || 30.4 || .403 || .400 || .824 || 4.1 || 2.9 || 1.7 || .5 || 12.2
|-
| style="text-align:left;"|
| style="text-align:left;"|L.A. Clippers
| 78 || 49 || 27.4 || .407 || .397 || .780 || 5.0 || 3.8 || .9 || .6 || 7.6
|-
| style="text-align:left;"|
| style="text-align:left;"|L.A. Clippers
| 51 || 50 || 26.3 || .431 || .388 || .660 || 5.2 || 3.6 || 1.1 || .5 || 7.9
|-
| style="text-align:left;"|
| style="text-align:left;"|L.A. Clippers
| 37 || 34 || 22.5 || .423 || .397 || .800 || 3.2 || 2.1 || .8 || .8 || 7.5 
|-
| style="text-align:left;"|
| style="text-align:left;"|Minnesota
| 58 || 54 || 25.4 || .406 || .343 || .722 || 4.1 || 4.6 || 1.2 || .9 || 9.2 
|-
| style="text-align:left;"|
| style="text-align:left;"|L.A. Lakers
| 45 || 45 || 26.9 || .402 || .348 || .780 || 3.1 || 2.6 || .9 || .6 || 6.4 
|- class="sortbottom"
| style="text-align:center;" colspan="2"|Career
| 571 || 483 || 27.4 || .413 || .376 || .758 || 4.2 || 3.4 || 1.1 || .5 || 8.7

Playoffs

|-
| style="text-align:left;"|2013
| style="text-align:left;"|Houston
| 6 || 5 || 33.3 || .431 || .333 || 1.000 || 5.5 || 2.8 || 1.2 || .7 || 11.8
|-
| style="text-align:left;"|2014
| style="text-align:left;"|Houston
| 6|| 6 || 33.7 || .380 || .318 || .700 || 4.2 || 1.8 || .5 || .3 || 8.7
|-
| style="text-align:left;"|2016
| style="text-align:left;"|Houston
| 5 || 5 || 25.8 || .270 || .214 || 1.000 || 4.4 || 2.2 || .4 || .4 || 5.8
|-
| style="text-align:left;"|2017
| style="text-align:left;"|Houston
| 11 || 11 || 29.5 || .413 || .404 || .786 || 5.5 || 4.2 || 1.5|| .2 || 11.1
|-
| style="text-align:left;"|2019
| style="text-align:left;"|L.A. Clippers
| 6 || 6 || 32.5 || .426 || .433 || .750|| 8.0 || 4.7 || 1.0 || 1.0 || 9.8
|-
| style="text-align:left;"|2020
| style="text-align:left;"|L.A. Clippers
| 8 || 8 || 20.8 || .513 || .364 || .500 || 4.1 || 2.4 || 1.0 || .4 || 6.3 
|-
| style="text-align:left;"|2021
| style="text-align:left;"|L.A. Clippers
| 17 || 7 || 19.0 || .426 || .351 || .857 || 2.4 || 1.4 || .7 || .7 || 4.9
|-
| style="text-align:left;"|2022
| style="text-align:left;"|Minnesota
| 6 || 6 || 32.3 || .429 || .346 || .682 || 3.2 || 4.8 || 1.2 || 1.3 || 11.0
|-
| style="text-align:center;" colspan="2"|Career
| 65 || 54 || 26.7 || .414 || .361 || .776 || 4.3 || 2.6 || .9 || .6 || 8.2

EuroLeague

|-
| style="text-align:left;"|2009–10
| style="text-align:left;"|Olympiacos
| 19 || 5 || 9.3 || .514 || .182 || .824 || 1.9 || .6 || .6 || .2 || 2.7 || 4.4
|- class="sortbottom"
| style="text-align:center;" colspan="2"|Career
| 19 || 5 || 9.3 || .514 || .182 || .824 || 1.9 || .6 || .6 || .2 || 2.7 || 4.4

College

|-
|style="text-align:left;"|2006–07
|style="text-align:left;"|Arkansas
|35||34||34.4||.427||.386||.812||4.5||3.1||1.7||.4||13.9
|-
|style="text-align:left;"|2007–08
|style="text-align:left;"|Arkansas
|35||33||33.8||.412||.378||.644||6.6||2.4||1.3||.5||12.1
|-
| style="text-align:center;" colspan="2"|Career
| 70 || 67 || 34.1 || .420 || .382 || .730 || 5.5 || 2.8 || 1.5 || .4 || 13.0

Personal life
Beverley has a son and daughter. On May 7, 2017, Beverley's grandfather died hours before Game 4 of the Western Conference semifinals against the San Antonio Spurs.

In 2007, Beverley featured in the documentary film Hoop Reality, the unofficial sequel to 1994's Hoop Dreams.

References

External links

 Patrick Beverley at euroleague.net
 Patrick Beverley at esake.gr 
 Arkansas Razorbacks bio

1988 births
Living people
American expatriate basketball people in Greece
American expatriate basketball people in Russia
American expatriate basketball people in Ukraine
American men's basketball players
Arkansas Razorbacks men's basketball players
Barstool Sports people
Basketball players from Chicago
BC Spartak Saint Petersburg players
Chicago Bulls players
Houston Rockets players
Los Angeles Clippers players
Los Angeles Lakers draft picks
Los Angeles Lakers players
Minnesota Timberwolves players
Olympiacos B.C. players
Point guards
Shooting guards
Utah Jazz players